The women's team squash event of the 2015 Pan American Games was held from July 14–17 at the Exhibition Centre in Toronto. The defending Pan American Games champion is  Canada.

Schedule
All times are Central Standard Time (UTC-6).

Results

Round Robin
The round robin will be used as a qualification round. The eight teams will be split into groups of   four. The top two teams from each group will advance to the first round of playoffs.

Pool A

Pool B

Playoffs

Places 5 to 8

Gold medal

Final standings

References

External links 
 Results on squashsite.co.uk

Squash at the 2015 Pan American Games
2015 in women's squash